Shaki fortress is a fortress in Shaki, Azerbaijan. It dates to the 15th century.

Notes

15th-century fortifications
Castles and fortresses in Azerbaijan